Wallwa Qhata (Quechua wallwa a medical plant (Psoralea glandulosa, Otholobium glandulosum), qhata slope, hillside, "wallwa slope", Hispanicized spelling Huallhuacata) is a mountain in the Cusco Region in Peru, about  high. It is situated in the Calca Province, San Salvador District. Wallwa Qhata lies on the right bank of the Willkanuta River. The village of Wallwa (Huallhua) is situated at its feet.

References 

Mountains of Peru
Mountains of Cusco Region